Antalya Büyükşehir Belediyesi Spor Kulübü (English: Antalya Greater Metropolitan Municipality Sports Club), commonly abbreviated as Antalya BB is a basketball team based in the city of Antalya in Turkey. Their home arena is the Dilek Sabancı Sport Hall with a capacity of 2,500 seats.

History
It was founded first as Antalyaspor in 1966. It played in First League between 1993-1996. It qualified to play-offs in 1994-1995 season after finishing 6th with 17 wins. It 3-1 defeated Meysuspor at 1st round but was eliminated by Tofaş SAS by 3-0 at quarter final. It was renamed as Muratpaşa Belediyespor in 1996-1997 season and returned to First League in 1997. Muratpaşa Belediyespor played the league between 1997-1999. It merged with basketball branch of Antbirlik (founded in 1978), who played First League between 1981-1982 and 1994-1996. It also played in 2000-2001 season as Muratpaşa Belediyespor Antbirlik. It took present name in 2002 and was promoted to First League as champions of final group in 2006-2007 season. It finished 6th with 18 wins and qualified to play-offs but was eliminated by Fenerbahçe Ülker as 3-1 in 2007-2008 season. It finished again 6th and qualified to play-offs but was eliminated by again Fenerbahçe Ülker as 3-0 in 2008-2009 season.

Season by season

Notable players

  Barış Hersek
  Bora Paçun
  Can Akın
  Melih Mahmutoğlu
  Muratcan Güler
  Nedim Yücel
  Rasim Başak
  Patrick Femerling
  Kristaps Valters
  Marcus Douthit
  Stevan Jelovac
  Aaron Jackson
  Corey Fisher
  Frank Elegar
  Jamon Gordon
  Marcus Douthit
  Mike Green
  Patrick Christopher
  Ralph Mims
  Ricardo Marsh
  Cartier Martin
  Jermareo Davidson
  Jordan Theodore
  Stacey King

External links
TBLStat.net Profile

References

Basketball teams established in 1995
Basketball teams in Turkey
Turkish Basketball Super League teams
Sport in Antalya